Örebro Airport  is located 10 kilometers southwest of Örebro and is Sweden's 23rd-largest passenger airport and the fourth-largest cargo airport. It was opened in 1979. The airport handled 101,669 passengers in 2013.

Airlines and destinations

Passenger

The following airlines operate regular scheduled and charter services to and from Örebro:

Cargo

Statistics

Ground transportation
A coach service is operated by Let's Go By Bus Örebro between the airport and Örebro Central, with services timed to coincide with the Ryanair flights to and from London Stanstead on Mondays and Fridays. Tickets can be bought on the bus or on the FlixBus website. The nearest public bus stop, (about 2 km away) has services to and from the centre of Örebro. It is served by bus 620 on weekdays and bus 600 at weekends. Other transport alternatives will likely involve a car or taxi. Most flights are tourist charter which attracts child families who mostly use their car for transport. There are many parking spaces, which have a fee.

Accidents and incidents
 On 8 July 2021, a single-engine DHC-2 Beaver carrying 8 skydivers plus 1 pilot crashed shortly after takeoff from Örebro Airport. All 9 people died.

References

External links

Official site (English)

Airports in Sweden
Buildings and structures in Örebro Municipality
Airports established in 1979
1979 establishments in Sweden
International airports in Sweden